David Naguib Pellow (born 1969) is  Dehlsen Chair and Professor of Environmental Studies and Director of the Global Environmental Justice Project at the University of California, Santa Barbara. Previously he was Professor, Don Martindale Endowed Chair, Department of Sociology, University of Minnesota and Associate Professor of Ethnic Studies at the University of California, San Diego. His area of specialisation include issues concerning environmental justice, race and ethnicity,  labour, social protest, animal rights, immigration, free trade agreements, globalization, the global impacts of the high tech industry in Asia, Latin America and elsewhere.

Biography and Education
He received a Ph. D in Sociology from Northwestern University in 1998, with a thesis "Black workers in green industries : the hidden infrastructure of environmental racism."

Focus of work 
Pellow's work  has focused on the "social and environmental impacts of the U.S. and international waste management industries (garbage, pesticides, incineration, electronic computer wastes etc.) and the global social protest movement that has emerged to combat this."   He has also published on issues such as  environmental racism, racial capitalism, occupational health hazards, economic globalization, international environmental protest movements, Silicon Valley industries, the global environment in high tech and social impacts, waste management industry, recycling industry, international movement of hazardous chemical wastes and international laws/conventions/treaties concerning environmental protection.

Books

Authored

The Silicon Valley of Dreams: Environmental Justice, Immigrant Workers, and the High-Tech Global Economy New York University Press 2002, (with Lisa Sun-Hee Park); 
Urban Recycling and the Search for Sustainable Community Development Princeton University Press 2002, (with Adam S. Weinberg and Allan Schnaiberg); 
Garbage Wars: The Struggle for Environmental Justice in Chicago MIT Press, 2004
Challenging the Chip: Labor Rights and Environmental Justice in the Global Electronics Industry. Philadelphia: Temple University Press, 2006 (with Ted Smith and David Allen Sommerfeld)
Translated into Chinese by Di qiu gong min ji jin hui. 挑戰晶片 : 全球電子業的勞動權與環境正義 / Tiao zhan jing pian : quan qiu dian zi ye de lao dong quan yu huan jing zheng yi  Xin bei shi xin dian qu : Qun xue, 2014  
Translated into Korean by  Jeong-ok Kong. Challenging the chip : segye jeonja saneob-ui nodong-gwon-gwa hwan-gyeong jeong-ui Seoul : May Day Publishers, 2009. 
The Treadmill of Production: Injustice and Unsustainability in the Global Economy Paradigm Press 2008, (with Kenneth Gould and Allan Schnaiberg)
Total Liberation: The Power and Promise of Animal Rights and the Radical Earth Movement University of Minnesota Press 2014
Resisting Global Toxics: Transnational Movements for Environmental Justice MIT Press 2014; 
What is Critical Environmental Justice? Polity Press 2018

Edited
Power, Justice, and the Environment: A Critical Appraisal of the Environmental Justice Movement  MIT Press,  2005.  (co-edited   with Robert J. Brulle )
Keywords for Environmental Studies New York University Press, 2016 (co-edited with Joni Adamson and William Gleason);

References

External links
Web page for David N. Pellow at UCSB

1969 births
Living people
American sociologists
Environmental sociologists
American non-fiction environmental writers
University of California, San Diego faculty
University of Minnesota faculty
University of California, Santa Barbara faculty
Activists from California
Environmental justice scholars